Keith Parker Williams was a  Republican member of the North Carolina General Assembly representing the state's fourteenth House district, including constituents in Onslow county.  A real estate broker and developer from Hubert, North Carolina, Williams served one term (2003-2004 session) in the state House.

References

External links

Republican Party members of the North Carolina House of Representatives
Living people
Year of birth missing (living people)
21st-century American politicians